Nam Khun is a district (amphoe) in the southwestern part of Ubon Ratchathani province, northeastern Thailand. The name of the district translates to 'muddy water'.

History
The area of Nam Khun was originally part of Nam Yuen district. The government created the minor district (king amphoe) on 15 July 1996.

On 15 May 2007, all of 81 minor districts were upgraded to full districts. On 24 August the upgrade became official.

Geography
The district is bounded in the south by the Dangrek Range.

Neighboring districts are (from the west clockwise) Kantharalak of Sisaket province; Thung Si Udom, Det Udom and Nam Yuen of Ubon Ratchathani; and Preah Vihear of Cambodia.

Administration
The district is divided into four sub-districts (tambons), which are further subdivided into 49 villages (mubans). There are no municipal (thesaban) areas, and four tambon administrative organizations (TAO).

References

External links
amphoe.com

Nam Khun